Baba Dariya Din is a medium size village in Ganderbal district of Jammu and Kashmir, India. It has populace of 479 of which 255 are males while 224 are females according to Population Census 2011.

Reference

Jammu and Kashmir
Cities and towns in Ganderbal district